The Argiles du Gault is an Albian geologic formation in northern France, it is equivalent to the Gault of southern England. Dinosaur remains are among the fossils that have been recovered from the formation, although none have yet been referred to a specific genus.

See also

Gault
 List of dinosaur-bearing rock formations
 List of stratigraphic units with indeterminate dinosaur fossils

Footnotes

References
 Weishampel, David B.; Dodson, Peter; and Osmólska, Halszka (eds.): The Dinosauria, 2nd, Berkeley: University of California Press. 861 pp. .

Geologic formations of France
Geologic formations of the United Kingdom
Lower Cretaceous Series of Europe
Albian Stage